Jason Richard de Vos (born January 2, 1974) is a Canadian former professional soccer player who played as a central defender. An international for Canada, de Vos played in Canada and the United Kingdom – most notably with Wigan Athletic and Ipswich Town.

In 2012, as part of the Canadian Soccer Association's centennial celebration, he was named to the all-time Canada XI men's team. In 2016, he was named the Director of Development for the Canadian Soccer Association.

Club career
Jason de Vos began his professional career in 1990 as a 15-year-old high schooler with hometown club the London Lasers of the former Canadian Soccer League (CSL). When the club folded he joined the Kitchener Kickers, also of the CSL.  When the latter club also folded he rejoined the re-established Lasers in 1992, the last year of operations for the CSL.

Known for his ability in the air, De Vos spent the next five seasons with the Montreal Impact of the then American Professional Soccer League, the last two on loan to English Third Division club Darlington.  In 1998 De Vos first signed a contract with the Darlington before moving to Dundee United of the Scottish Premier League in October on a £400,000 transfer.  He spent three seasons with The Terrors, captaining the side in 2000–01.  He was then signed by Wigan Athletic of the then English Second Division for £500,000 in 2001.  De Vos captained the side to its promotion to the First Division in 2002–03 and was named in that season's PFA Division Two Team of the Year. Following an injury-plagued 2003–04, which saw Wigan just miss out on a FA Premier League play-off place, De Vos left on a Bosman transfer and joined Ipswich Town FC. Since joining Ipswich, he held down a regular place in the centre of defence, often playing through many injuries, often captaining the team in Jim Magilton's absence. In June 2006, Jim Magilton was appointed manager of Ipswich Town and made de Vos the new captain.
He retired from club and international soccer in 2008.

International career
De Vos represented Canada at the 1991 Pan American Games.
He appeared in 49 full internationals, scoring four goals. He debuted on August 19, 1997, in a 1–0 home loss friendly to Iran. He has represented Canada in 11 FIFA World Cup qualification matches and played at the 2001 Confederations Cup. He captained the Canadian team from 1999 until his retirement from international football in 2004.  De Vos was named a tournament all-star for both the 2000 and 2002 CONCACAF Gold Cup tournaments, in which Canada were placed first and third respectively.  He scored the winning goal in the final of the 2000 Gold Cup, a match Canada won 2–0 over Colombia.

Retirement
After the final match of the 2007–08 season in the 1–0 win over Hull City, De Vos announced his immediate retirement from playing to take up a media role in his native Canada and was given a guard of honour and standing ovation during the teams parade lap of the pitch.

De Vos will also scout players from the MLS for former-club Ipswich Town.

De Vos provided commentary on the FIFA 2010 World Cup for CBC and on Toronto FC matches for CBC and GolTV Canada.

De Vos was the colour Commentator for CBC Sports's coverage of Football at the 2008 Summer Olympics in Beijing, China.

Fall of 2010 he accepted the position of Technical Director at Oakville Soccer Club.

On May 4, de Vos stepped down as Technical Director at Oakville Soccer Club after accepting a full-time position with TSN as a broadcaster.

Since April 2013 is de Vos Member of the Canadian Soccer Hall of Fame.

In January 2015, de Vos confirmed that he would begin work towards his UEFA Pro Licence in May of that year in Ireland.

On August 30, 2016, he was named the Director of Development for the Canadian Soccer Association.

Career statistics

International
Source:

International goals
Scores and results list Canada's goal tally first, score column indicates score after each de Vos goal.

Honours

Player
Wigan Athletic
Football League Second Division: 2002–03

Canada
CONCACAF Gold Cup: 2000

Individual
CONCACAF Gold Cup Best XI: 2000, 2002
CONCACAF Gold Cup Fair Play Award: 2000
Canadian Player of the Year: 2002
Manchester Evening News/GMR Sports Personality of the Month: April 2003
Wigan Athletic Player of the Year: 2002–03
PFA Team of the Year: 2002–03 Second Division
Ipswich Town Players' Player of the Year: 2005–06
Canadian Soccer Hall of Fame: Inducted 2013
Ipswich Town F.C. Hall of Fame: Inducted 2019

References

External links
 / Canada Soccer Hall of Fame
Jason de Vos profile at Ipswich Town Talk

Sporting-Heroes.net with a picture, profile and career British footballing statistics of De Vos

1974 births
2000 CONCACAF Gold Cup players
2001 FIFA Confederations Cup players
2002 CONCACAF Gold Cup players
2003 CONCACAF Gold Cup players
A-League (1995–2004) players
American Professional Soccer League players
Association football defenders
Canada men's international soccer players
Canada men's youth international soccer players
Canadian soccer commentators
Canadian expatriate soccer players
Canadian people of Dutch descent
Canadian Soccer League (1987–1992) players
Canadian soccer players
CONCACAF Gold Cup-winning players
Darlington F.C. players
Dundee United F.C. players
Expatriate footballers in England
Expatriate footballers in Scotland
Ipswich Town F.C. players
Living people
London Lasers players
Major League Soccer broadcasters
Montreal Impact (1992–2011) players
Scottish Premier League players
Soccer players from London, Ontario
English Football League players
Wigan Athletic F.C. players
Pan American Games competitors for Canada
Footballers at the 1991 Pan American Games
Canadian expatriate sportspeople in Scotland
Canadian expatriate sportspeople in England
Kitchener Spirit players